Gerard ter Borch (1583 in Zwolle – 1662 in Zwolle), was a Dutch Golden Age painter.

According to Arnold Houbraken, who referred to him as Gerard Terburg's father, he was a good painter who had spent many years in Rome and who was the first teacher of his better known son.

According to the RKD, he was the pupil of Pieter de Molijn and became the father of the painters Gerard II, Gesina, Harmen and Moses.
He was in Italy during the years 1604–1611.

Gallery

References

External links

Gerard ter Borch the Elder at Artnet

1583 births
1662 deaths
Dutch Golden Age painters
Dutch male painters
People from Zwolle